Interstate 422 (I-422), Corridor X-1, or the Birmingham Northern Beltline is a proposed  northern bypass route around Birmingham, Alabama, through northern and western Jefferson County that is projected to be completed by 2047. Along with the existing I-459, the Northern Beltline would complete the bypass loop of central Birmingham for all Interstate traffic. The project's budget is $5.445 billion; upon completion, the Northern Beltline will be the most expensive road in Alabama's history, and among the most expensive per mile ever built in the United States.

Current plans for the route have it connecting to I-59 at I-459's current southern terminus in Bessemer, at approximately milemarker 147 to the northeast of Trussville, near Argo. Additional studies are underway to determine the economic feasibility to continue the route from its proposed northeastern terminus southward to I-20 in the Leeds–Moody area in western St. Clair county. 

The route has been designated as the Appalachian Regional Commission's high-priority Corridor X-1, unsigned State Route 959 (SR 959), and I-422. The 422 numbering does not conform to normal Interstate guidelines, since it only crosses its "parent" route I-22 in the middle (and will connect only via I-222), while bypass and loop routes are usually numbered by the route connected to at or near each end, which would result in the use of a number such as 659.

History
As early as the 1960s, the prospect of a complete beltway encircling Birmingham was envisioned. Although the proposal was initially dropped from the original Interstate Highway System, the completion of Birmingham's outer beltway has been speculated since the completion of I-459 in 1985. By 1989, the first federal and local funds were earmarked for a project to study the feasibility of constructing the route.

In September 1993, the Birmingham Metropolitan Planning Organization made a $500,000 request from the Alabama Department of Transportation (ALDOT) for preliminary engineering of the beltline. Through the continued efforts of representative Spencer Bachus, in June 1995, the project was designated by the Federal Highway Administration as part of the National Highway System. As a result of this designation, the beltline would be eligible for federal transportation funding.

In 1997, the Environmental Protection Agency (EPA) reviewed a number of potential routes for the Birmingham Northern Beltline. They submitted comments on September 8, 1997, and recommended ALDOT select a shorter,  route due to its smaller environmental impact. They also firmly recommended against the longest route, citing that the route would "disrupt streams at 14 crossings, impact over 4050 acres [] forested lands within the ROW, and will destroy up to 68 acres [] of wetlands at 114 different sites. It will also have the greatest impact on wildlife of all the alignments discussed". This is the route that ALDOT eventually selected for the Northern Beltline.

In 2000, the Northern Beltline was added to the area’s Transportation Plan, and, in 2001, Senator Richard Shelby and Congressman Spencer Bachus secured $60 million to buy right of-way and do preliminary engineering for the route. In 2003, Shelby secured an additional $2 million for the continued purchasing of right-of-way. Progress continues with the purchasing of additional right-of-way through the county as of 2006. In May 2009, Bachus announced in the Birmingham News that the Northern Beltline had been designated as I-422.

Construction started on a  section north of Pinson on February 24, 2014, which will connect State Route 79 (SR 79) near White Oaks to SR 75 near Palmerdale. This section is budgeted to cost $46 million and was expected to be completed by fall 2016.

Controversy
The construction of the Northern Beltline has significant opposition from local communities and local conservation groups. Environmental groups filed lawsuits in 2011 and 2013 to block construction of the beltline in federal court. The groups cited the project's environmental and economic impact in their filing. The groups' request for preliminary injunction to stop construction was blocked in January 2014. The Northern Beltline is to cross Black Warrior and Cahaba river tributaries in 90 places, including two major sources of drinking water, and could affect 35 wetland areas once constructed. Some groups, such as OCHS, claim that the Beltline could increase traffic congestion on I-59.

The  project was budgeted to cost $5.445 billion, making it the most expensive road project in Alabama history. At , this budget also makes the Northern Beltline one of the most expensive roads per mile built in the US. This cost does not include the cost of extending sewer services, powerlines, and other needed infrastructure where beltline is to be constructed. In 2010, a study estimated 69,535 jobs could be created by the beltline. A later study projected that 2,805 jobs could be added in the area by 2048.

Exit list

References

 Roberts, Chris (September 15, 1993). "JeffCo, Shelby getting $120 million for roads." Birmingham News
 Gordon, Tom (June 10, 1995) "Northern Beltline gets federal priority." Birmingham News
 Nicholson, Gilbert (May 11, 2001). "Northern Beltline: Land rush may ensue when road's route announced this summer." Birmingham Business Journal.
 Birmingham Business Journal (September 4, 2003). "Sen. Shelby continues to bring home transportation bacon." Birmingham Business Journal.
 Corridor X-1 at Regional Planning Commission of Greater Birmingham site
 ALDOT, FHWA, Final Environmental Impact Statement Reevaluation, March 2012, Appendix L.

External links

 Northern Beltline psgr pm SL DOT site
 Corridor X-1 at AARoads.com

X-1
Transportation in Alabama
22-4
Transportation in Jefferson County, Alabama
Bypasses in Alabama